Ponta Cais is a headland and the northernmost point of the island of Maio, Cape Verde. It is about 8 km north of the nearest village, Cascabulho. There is a lighthouse on the headland.

See also
		
List of lighthouses in Cape Verde

References

Headlands of Cape Verde
Cais
Ponta Cais